Umrali is a village in Alirajpur district of Madhya Pradesh state of India.

References

Villages in Alirajpur district